Cucumber Run is a  long 3rd order tributary to the Youghiogheny River in Fayette County, Pennsylvania.

Course
Cucumber Run rises about 2 miles southeast of Deer Lake, Pennsylvania, and then flows northeast to join the Youghiogheny River about 0.25 miles southeast of Ohiopyle.

Watershed
Cucumber Run drains  of area, receives about 51.1 in/year of precipitation, has a wetness index of 350.68, and is about 85% forested.

See also
List of rivers of Pennsylvania

References

Tributaries of the Youghiogheny River
Rivers of Pennsylvania
Rivers of Fayette County, Pennsylvania